Mary Dormal (?–?) was an Argentine actress and vedette of the 1930s. She was one of the notable performers of the golden decade (1938–1948). Dormal worked with the director Manuel Romero, and with the film actors, Paulina Singerman, Enrique Serrano, and Niní Marshall. In theater, she appeared with Camila Quiroga, Norma Castillo, Nelida Quiroga, Mangacha Gutierrez, Arrieta Rosita Blanca Vidal, Dora Dolly, and Carmen Castex. Dorman was born in Buenos Aires and died there as well.

Filmography 
 1938: La rubia del camino 
 1938: La chismosa 
 1939: Mandinga en la sierra  
 1939: Divorcio en Montevideo 
 1939: Muchachas que estudian 
 1939: Chimbela
 1939: La pícara mentirosa 
 1940: El solterón 
 1940: Isabelita  
 1942: La novia de primavera
 1943: Juvenilla
 1948: Porteña de corazón

References

Actresses from Buenos Aires
Argentine film actresses
Argentine stage actresses
Argentine vedettes
Year of birth missing
Year of death missing
20th-century Argentine actresses